Legacy Christian Academy is private, non-denominational school located in Beaumont, Texas.

External links 
Official website

High schools in Jefferson County, Texas
Education in Beaumont, Texas
Private K-12 schools in Texas
Preparatory schools in Texas